In mathematics, a semi-local ring is a ring for which R/J(R) is a semisimple ring, where J(R) is the Jacobson radical of R. 

The above definition is satisfied if R has a finite number of maximal right ideals (and finite number of maximal left ideals).  When R is a commutative ring, the converse implication is also true, and so the definition of semi-local for commutative rings is often taken to be "having finitely many maximal ideals".

Some literature refers to a commutative semi-local ring in general as a
quasi-semi-local ring, using semi-local ring to refer to a Noetherian ring with finitely many maximal ideals.

A semi-local ring is thus more general than a local ring, which has only one maximal (right/left/two-sided) ideal.

Examples 
 Any right or left Artinian ring, any serial ring, and any semiperfect ring is semi-local. 
 The quotient  is a semi-local ring. In particular, if  is a prime power, then  is a local ring.
 A finite direct sum of fields  is a semi-local ring. 
 In the case of commutative rings with unity, this example is prototypical in the following sense: the Chinese remainder theorem shows that for a semi-local commutative ring R with unit and maximal ideals m1, ..., mn
.
(The map is the natural projection). The right hand side is a direct sum of fields.  Here we note that ∩i mi=J(R), and we see that R/J(R) is indeed a semisimple ring.
 The classical ring of quotients for any commutative Noetherian ring is a semilocal ring.
 The endomorphism ring of an Artinian module is a semilocal ring.
 Semi-local rings occur for example in algebraic geometry when a (commutative) ring R is localized with respect to the multiplicatively closed subset S = ∩ (R \ pi), where the pi are finitely many prime ideals.

Textbooks

Ring theory
Localization (mathematics)